Koogle was a flavored peanut spread marketed by Kraft, introduced in  1971. It was available in several flavors, including chocolate, cinnamon, vanilla and banana.

Ingredients
The ingredient list for Koogle changed over its lifetime. Examples of ingredient lists include:

Chocolate: U.S. grade no. 1 peanuts, partially hardened vegetable oils, sugar, cocoa processed with alkali, dextrose, salt, nonfat dry milk, artificial flavor
Chocolate: Peanuts, partially hardened vegetable oils, sugar, milk chocolate (with artificial flavor and emulsifier added), chocolate liquor, dextrose, salt, artificial flavor 
 Cinnamon: U.S. grade no. 1 peanuts, partially hardened vegetable oils, sugar, cinnamon, dextrose, salt

Marketing
Many of Koogle's TV commercials featured the product's mascot, an oversized puppet costume in the abstract form of a giant jar with spinning eyeballs, frog-like arms and legs, and a "jive" voice similar to that of then-popular radio disc jockey Wolfman Jack. In the premiere commercial the mascot danced to a jingle, "Pea-nutty-koogle with the koo-koo-koogly eyes," which was modeled on Billy Rose's 1923 hit song "Barney Google (with the Goo-Goo-Googly Eyes)". Subsequent commercials had the mascot explaining the product to children in "jive" talk, or mothers endorsing the product to make it more appealing to mothers so they would be more willing to buy it for their children.

References

External links
 Koogle TV commercial

Kraft Foods brands